Solieria is a genus of flies in the family Tachinidae.

Species
S. borealis Ringdahl, 1947
S. boreotis (Reinhard, 1967)
S. eucerata (Bigot, 1889)
S. fenestrata (Meigen, 1824)
S. flava (Townsend, 1908)
S. inanis (Fallén, 1810)
S. munda Richter, 1975
S. pacifica (Meigen, 1824)
S. pallida (Coquillett, 1897)
S. piperi (Coquillett, 1897)
S. vacua (Rondani, 1861)

References

Tachininae
Tachinidae genera
Taxa named by Jean-Baptiste Robineau-Desvoidy